or the Fukagawa Festival, is one of the three great Shinto festivals of Tokyo, along with the Kanda Matsuri and Sannō Matsuri. 

The Fukagawa Matsuri is held annually in mid-August by the Tomioka Hachiman Shrine in Koto, Tokyo. Tomioka Hachimangu, also known as Tomioka Yawata shrine, is Fukagawa's greatest shinto shrine, and was established in 1627. The festival, is believed to date back to 1642, and is one of the three greatest festivals of Edo, together with Sanno Matsuri of Kojimachi Hie Shrine and Kanda Matsuri of Kanda Shrine.

See also 
 Culture of Japan
 Japanese calendar
 Japanese festivals
 Festivals in Tokyo

External links 

 

Religious festivals in Japan
Festivals in Tokyo
Japanese culture
Shinto festivals
Shinto in Tokyo
Festivals established in 1642
1642 establishments in Asia
Summer events in Japan